Sergey Ivanovich Spasokukotsky (Kostroma—December 17, 1943, Moscow) was a Russian Empire and Soviet surgeon and a member of the Soviet Academy of Sciences since 1942. He was awarded the State Prize of the USSR for his monography Lung actinomycosis, apart from other distinctions (Order of Lenin and Order of the Red Banner of Labour).

References
Great Soviet Encyclopedia

Soviet surgeons
Surgeons from the Russian Empire
Full Members of the USSR Academy of Sciences
1870 births
1943 deaths
20th-century surgeons